Ilpo Tiihonen (1 September 1950 – 8 June 2021) was a Finnish writer and recipient of the Eino Leino Prize in 1991. He was born in Kuopio and died, aged 70, in Ylöjärvi.

References

1950 births
2021 deaths
People from Kuopio
Writers from North Savo
Finnish writers
Recipients of the Eino Leino Prize